Gems Sensors and Controls is a global manufacturer of application engineered sensors. Founded in 1955, it makes level, pressure and flow sensors for use in a wide range of fluids across industry.

Gems Sensors is a division of Fortive Corporation, a company with a presence around the world. The company provides manufacturing services in North America, Europe, and Asia. It also has sales, engineering, and service offices in different parts of the world.

History

Founded by Edward Moore & Gordon Seigle along with an associate, Gems Sensors & Controls (Gems) has been operational since 1955  and is based in Plainville, Connecticut, USA. Gems Sensors received its first commercial acclaim for a bilge switch developed for the small boating industry.

Products

Gems Sensors Inc. designs and manufactures liquid level, flow switches and pressure switches, miniature solenoid valves, and pre-assembled fluidic systems. The company is also into manufacturing customized level sensors, pressure sensors, proximity switches, solenoid valves, fluidic systems, flow sensors, and Warrick controls. It offers its products to different markets like alternative energy, semiconductor manufacturing, process tank gauging, waste water procession and other marine and industrial applications.

References

Electronics companies of the United States
Manufacturing companies based in Connecticut
Companies based in Hartford County, Connecticut
Electronics companies established in 1955
Plainville, Connecticut
Sensors